The Lent Bumps 2001 were a series of rowing races held at Cambridge University from Tuesday 27 February 2001 until Thursday 1 March 2001. The event was run as a bumps race and is one of a series of Lent Bumps which have been held annually in late-February or early March since 1887. See Lent Bumps for the format of the races. In 2001, a total of 121 crews took part (69 men's crews and 52 women's crews), with around 1000 participants in total. Several thousand spectators came to watch, particularly on the Saturday.

The bumps were scheduled to run until Saturday 3 March. The racing was cancelled on the Friday and Saturday due to an outbreak of Foot and Mouth disease which forced the closure of the towpath. Since all the umpiring takes place from the towpath, there was no choice but to cancel the remaining races.

Following a dispute in the women's 1st division on Thursday, Girton, 1st & 3rd Trinity and Churchill were scheduled to re-row their race on Friday, but the races were cancelled before the re-row was completed.

Head of the River crews
Because the races were not completed, no headships were awarded. When the races were cancelled, Emmanuel men and Jesus women were in 1st position.

Highest 2nd VIIIs
The highest men's 2nd VIII when the races were cancelled was Caius II.

The highest women's 2nd VIII when the races were cancelled was Jesus II, who bumped Lady Margaret II on the 1st day.

Links to races in other years

Bumps Charts
Below are the bumps charts for the 1st and 2nd divisions, with the men's event on the left and women's event on the right. The bumps chart represents the progress of every crew over all four days of the racing. To follow the progress of any particular crew, simply find the crew's name on the left side of the chart and follow the line to the end-of-the-week finishing position on the right of the chart.

Lent Bumps results
2001 in English sport
2001 in rowing